A surrey is a doorless, four-wheeled carriage popular in the United States during the late 19th and early 20th centuries. Usually two-seated and holding for four passengers, surreys had a variety of tops that included a rigid, fringed canopy, parasol, and extension. The seats were traditional, spindle-backed (often upholstered), bench seats. Before the advent of automobiles, these were horse-drawn carriages.

The name is short for "Surrey cart", named after Surrey in England, where they were first made.

In popular culture 
The American surrey was famously celebrated in the song "The Surrey with the Fringe on Top" from the musical Oklahoma!.

Gallery

See also 
 Types of carriages

References 

Carriages